Aviassiminea is a genus of minute operculate snails, marine gastropod mollusks or micromollusks in the family Assimineidae.

Species
Species within Aviassiminea include:

 Aviassiminea palitans Fukuda & Ponder, 2003

References

External links

Fukuda H. & Ponder W.F. 2003. Australian freshwater assimineids, with a synopsis of the Recent genus-group taxa of the Assimineidae (Mollusca: Caenogastropoda: Rissooidea). Journal of Natural History, 37: 1977-2032]

 [https://doi.org/10.1080/00222930210125380 

Assimineidae
Monotypic gastropod genera